Alone Again may refer to:

 Alone Again (album), by George Jones, 1976
 "Alone Again" (Alyssa Reid song), 2010
 "Alone Again" (Dokken song), 1985
 "Alone Again" (The Weeknd song), 2020
 "Alone Again", a song by the Bee Gees from 2 Years On, 1970
 "Alone Again", a song by the Slackers from The Question, 1998
 "Alone Again", a song by Teenager
 "Alone Again", an unreleased song by Kylie Minogue from White Diamond: A Personal Portrait of Kylie Minogue soundtrack

See also
Alone, Again, a 1975 album by Paul Bley
 Alone (Again), a 1977 album by Bill Evans
 Alone Again Or, a 1967 song by the band Love
 "Alone Again (Naturally)", a 1972 song by Gilbert O'Sullivan
 Alone Again (Naturally) (album), a 1972 album by Andy Williams